Ernest Moodie (born 29 June 1959) is a Caymanian former cyclist. He competed in three events at the 1984 Summer Olympics.

References

External links
 

1959 births
Living people
Caymanian male cyclists
Olympic cyclists of the Cayman Islands
Cyclists at the 1984 Summer Olympics
Place of birth missing (living people)